Sambou Yatabaré (born 2 March 1989) is a professional footballer who plays as a midfielder for Sochaux. Born in France, he represents Mali at international level.

Club career
Yatabaré has played for Caen, Monaco and Bastia.

Olympiacos and loans
On 30 August 2013, he signed a four-year contract with Greek side Olympiacos F.C., for a reported fee of €2.2 million. 
Six months later, lacking game-time in Greece, Yatabaré was sent back to Bastia on loan for six months where he made his return in the first team against Bordeaux on 18 January 2014. He spent the 2014–15 season in Ligue 1 with Guingamp. On 1 September 2015, he signed a year-long loan deal with Standard Liège.

Werder Bremen
On 28 January 2016, Yatabaré signed for Werder Bremen on 3 and a half-year contract running until 2019. While the transfer fee was reported as €2.5 million, Standard Liège also stated they had received €500,000 in compensation from Bremen to end the player's loan with the club.

Royal Antwerp (loan)
On 31 August 2017, the last day of the German summer transfer window, Yatabaré joined Royal Antwerp on loan for the 2017–18 season. His new club was given the option to sign him permanently.

In March 2018, Werder Bremen's sporting director Frank Baumann confirmed Yatabaré would join Antwerp permanently in the summer.

Sochaux
On 27 June 2022, Yatabaré joined Sochaux on a two-year contract.

International career
Yatabaré was eligible to play for the national teams of either France or Mali, making his international debut for Mali in 2008.

Yatabaré represented Mali at the 2015 Africa Cup of Nations, scoring the team's first goal of the tournament in a 1–1 draw with Cameroon on 20 January 2015.

Personal life
Yatabaré was born in France to a Malian father and Senegalese mother. His brother, Mustapha, is also a professional footballer, who has played for the Mali national side.

Career statistics

Club

International goals
Scores and results list Mali's goal tally first, score column indicates score after each Yatabaré goal.

Honours
Mali
Africa Cup of Nations bronze: 2013

References

1989 births
Living people
Sportspeople from Beauvais
Footballers from Hauts-de-France
Malian footballers
Mali international footballers
French footballers
Malian people of Senegalese descent
French sportspeople of Malian descent
French sportspeople of Senegalese descent
Association football midfielders
2013 Africa Cup of Nations players
2015 Africa Cup of Nations players
2017 Africa Cup of Nations players
Stade Malherbe Caen players
AS Monaco FC players
SC Bastia players
Olympiacos F.C. players
En Avant Guingamp players
Standard Liège players
SV Werder Bremen players
SV Werder Bremen II players
Royal Antwerp F.C. players
Amiens SC players
Valenciennes FC players
FC Sochaux-Montbéliard players
Ligue 1 players
Ligue 2 players
Bundesliga players
3. Liga players
Super League Greece players
Belgian Pro League players
Malian expatriate footballers
Expatriate footballers in Greece
Expatriate footballers in Germany
Expatriate footballers in Belgium
Malian expatriate sportspeople in Belgium
Malian expatriate sportspeople in Greece
Malian expatriate sportspeople in Germany
French expatriate footballers
French expatriate sportspeople in Greece
French expatriate sportspeople in Belgium
French expatriate sportspeople in Germany